Ray Hole Architects is an English architectural practice, based in Arundel, specialising in cultural and leisure-based projects. Their work includes:

 the VW and Bentley Pavilions at Autostadt 
 Ripley's Believe It or Not! Museum (2008) at the London Pavilion, Piccadilly Circus
 Hafod Eryri, the new £8.4M Snowdon summit building (2009)
 the new Seaton tram station
 buildings at Marwell Wildlife.
 masterplanning for the Hurghada Cultural Leisure Centre in Egypt

The VW Pavilion at Autostadt won an FX International Design and Architecture Award). Hafod Eryri won the National Eisteddfod of Wales Gold Medal for Architecture in 2009.

References

External links 
Ray Hole Architects

Architecture firms based in London
Welsh Eisteddfod Gold Medal winners
Companies based in the London Borough of Croydon